The UK Albums Chart is a music chart compiled by the Official Charts Company (OCC) that calculates the best-selling albums of the week in the United Kingdom. Initially based solely on the sales of albums in the vinyl and CD formats, digital albums began being included from April 2006. Since March 2015, the chart has also been based on audio streaming figures, however the OCC still compiles a 'sales' (only) chart and still quotes these traditional sales figures in its features and articles. 

This is a list of the 50 best-selling albums in the UK from 1 January 2000 onwards, as compiled by the OCC (sales that occurred before 2000 are not included). Of these, only two were originally released before the year 2000: White Ladder (1998) by David Gray and Gold: Greatest Hits (1992) by ABBA.

Back to Bedlam by James Blunt, which was the best-selling album of the 2000s decade, was also the best-selling album of the 21st century until August 2011 when it was passed in sales by Amy Winehouse's Back to Black, following Winehouse's death the previous month. Less than four months later, however, Back to Black was itself overtaken by Adele's 21. Adele is also the only artist to have all her studio albums released appear on the list.

Best-selling albums since 2000

Sales figures from the OCC on the date given in the reference. The OCC differentiate 'chart sales' (which include streaming) from 'sales' (which are downloads and physical purchases and are quoted below).

Originally released before 2000; position based on sales since 2000

See also
 List of best-selling singles of the 2000s (century) in the United Kingdom
 List of best-selling albums of the 2000s (decade) in the United Kingdom
 List of best-selling albums of the 2010s in the United Kingdom

Notes

References

2000s
Albums
United Kingdom
2000s (UK)
British record charts
21st century in the United Kingdom